Carmody is a surname of Irish origin. The name refers to:

Persons
Alan Carmody (1920–1978), an Australian public servant
Art Carmody (born 1984), an American college football kicker
Bill Carmody (born 1951), an American college basketball coach
David W. Carmody (1908–1976), Associate Justice of the New Mexico Supreme Court
Don Carmody (contemporary), an American film producer
Erin Carmody (born 1988), a Canadian (PEI) curler
Isobelle Carmody (born 1958), an Australian author of science fiction, fantasy, and children's books
John Carmody (judge) (1854–1920), Associate Justice of the North Dakota Supreme Court
John M. Carmody (1881–1963), an American administrator
Kev Carmody (born 1946), an Australian Indigenous singer-songwriter
Martin H. Carmody (1872–1950), an American Supreme Knight of the Knights of Columbus
Michael Carmody (contemporary), an Australian public servant; Commissioner of Taxation 1993–2005
Robert Carmody (1938–1967), an American Olympic boxer
Thomas Carmody (1859–1922), an American lawyer and politician, New York Attorney General 1911–1914
Thomas G. Carmody (born 1961), an American state legislator from  Louisiana
Tim Carmody (born 1956), an Australian judge

Places
Carmody Hills, Maryland, USA
Carmody, Minnesota, USA

See also